MBC 4 is a television channel in the Middle East. It was launched on 1 February 2005 at 5:00 P.M. (GMT) and is owned by the Middle East Broadcasting Center. MBC 4 airs international programmes with Arabic language subtitles. Programming is targeted towards women.

History  
MBC 4 was a spin-off of MBC 2 that began airing on 1 February 2005. Originally intended to provide Western news and entertainment to liberal adults, MBC 4 later transitioned to concentrate on women viewers. Programming on MBC 4 is supported by advertising. Its tagline is "So You can Watch What They Watch".

Programming 

MBC 4 airs series and talk shows from the United States, Turkey, United Kingdom, and Australia, subtitled in Arabic. Kissing scenes are typically edited out of programs from other countries.

Some  programmes that have aired on MBC4 include 3rd Rock from the Sun, Seinfeld, The Early Show, Jeopardy!, Days of Our Lives, Two and a Half Men, America's Got Talent, American Idol, Oprah, Friends, So You Think You Can Dance, The Late Show with David Letterman, The Talk, The Dr. Oz Show, The Vampire Diaries, Ringer, and Desperate Housewives.

It broadcast the Turkish soap operas Kiraz Mevsimi and Nour; however, airing of Turkish programmes was suspended in 2018 due to political tensions between Arab states and Turkey.

MBC 4 also airs original Arabic programmes. , the reality TV show Stars of Science has aired on MBC 4 for 14 seasons. MBC 4 aired a version of The X Factor for the Arab world.  In 2022, MBC 4 aired the original series Stiletto.

See also 
 MTV Middle East
 List of Turkish films
 Television in Turkey
 List of Turkish television series
 Turkish television drama
 MBC Group
 Television in the United Arab Emirates

References

External links
 
 MBC 4 at Telebisyon.net
 Wanasah 

Free-to-air
Arab mass media
Television channels and stations established in 2005
Middle East Broadcasting Center
Women's interest channels
Women's mass media